Anelaphus velteni is an extinct species of beetle in the family Cerambycidae that was found in the present-day Dominican Republic.

Discovery
It was first described by Vitali in 2009. Prehistoric specimens were found in Dominican amber on Hispaniola, in the Caribbean.

References

†
Prehistoric beetles
Burdigalian life
†
Miocene insects of North America
Prehistoric insects of the Caribbean
†
†
Fossils of the Dominican Republic
Extinct animals of the Dominican Republic
Dominican amber
Fossil taxa described in 2009